TGN-Pacific (TGN-P, previously VSNL Transpacific) is a submarine telecommunications cable system transiting the Pacific Ocean.

The cable system is constructed with one cable from Emi, Japan, to Hillsboro, Oregon, United States; one from Toyohashi, Japan, to Hillsboro; one from Toyohashi, Japan, to Los Angeles, California, United States; and one from Toyohashi to Guam. The cables between Japan and Hillsboro are each constructed with 8 fibre pairs per cable. At construction the cable could support up to 96 10 Gbit/s waves in its 2001 configuration. In 2014 the cable was upgraded to 100G optical transport.

It has landing points in:
Emi, Kamogawa City, Chiba Prefecture, Japan
Toyohashi, Aichi Prefecture, Japan 
Piti, Guam
Nedonna Beach, Tillamook County near Hillsboro, Washington County, Oregon, United States (two cable landing points)
Hermosa Beach, Los Angeles County, California, United States

Tata Communications (formerly VSNL) acquired the cable from its builder Tyco in May, 2005.

References

 
 

Submarine communications cables in the Pacific Ocean
Japan–United States relations